Daniel Keita-Ruel (born 21 September 1989) is a German professional footballer who plays as a centre-forward for  club Waldhof Mannheim.

Career
As a youth Keita joined Borussia Mönchengladbach from hometown club Wuppertaler SV. Having left Mönchengladbach, he joined fifth-tier club Bonner SC before returning to Wuppertal, where he made few appearances for the club fighting relegation in 3. Liga.

Keita spent almost four years in prison, having been found guilty in four cases of robbery, three of them rated as aggravated robberies and the first of which occurred in summer 2011 when he was 21. In 2014, he was sent to an open prison in Düsseldorf, allowing him to play semi-professional football for Oberliga side Ratinger SV as day-release prisoner. In his time there, he scored 18 goals in 50 matches. In the 2016–17 season he netted 12 times for SG Wattenscheid 09 in the fourth-tier Regionalliga.

In May 2017, 3. Liga club Fortuna Köln announced the signing of Keita on a one-year contract with the option of another.

In June 2018, Keita-Ruel moved to SpVgg Greuther Fürth for the 2018–19 season.

Keita-Ruel joined 3. Liga club Waldhof Mannheim on 18 August 2022.

Personal life
Keita was born in Germany to a Senegalese father and a French mother.

Career statistics

References

Living people
1989 births
Association football forwards
German footballers
German people of French descent
German people of Senegalese descent
Sportspeople from Wuppertal
Bonner SC players
Wuppertaler SV players
SG Wattenscheid 09 players
SC Fortuna Köln players
SpVgg Greuther Fürth players
SV Sandhausen players
SV Waldhof Mannheim players
2. Bundesliga players
3. Liga players
Regionalliga players
Criminals from North Rhine-Westphalia
Footballers from North Rhine-Westphalia